Seán Casey (9 May 1922 – 29 April 1967) was an Irish Labour Party politician and trade union official. He was first elected to Dáil Éireann as a Labour Party Teachta Dála (TD) for the Cork Borough constituency at the 1954 general election. He was re-elected at the 1957, 1961 and 1965 general elections. He died in April 1967 during the term of the 18th Dáil and the by-election held on 9 November 1967 was won by Seán French of Fianna Fáil.

He served as Lord Mayor of Cork in 1956, 1962 and 1966.

References

 

1922 births
1967 deaths
Labour Party (Ireland) TDs
Members of the 15th Dáil
Members of the 16th Dáil
Members of the 17th Dáil
Members of the 18th Dáil
Local councillors in Cork (city)
Lord Mayors of Cork
Irish trade unionists
Politicians from County Cork